R v Richards; Ex parte Fitzpatrick and Browne (1955) 92 CLR 157, was a legal case concerning the right of privilege of the Australian Parliament.

Background
On 3 May 1955, Charles Morgan, Labor member of the House of Representatives for the Division of Reid in New South Wales, informed Parliament that an article appearing in the Bankstown Observer for 28 April 1955 had impugned his personal honour and challenged his fitness to be a Member of Parliament. 

In an article headed "MHR and Immigration Racket", it was alleged that Morgan, a lawyer before entering Parliament, had engaged in corrupt schemes involving refugee migration from Europe to Australia before World War II. The Bankstown Observer, a free weekly newspaper distributed throughout areas of suburban Sydney that included the Reid electorate, was owned by Raymond Edward Fitzpatrick, a Bankstown businessman and political rival of Morgan. Morgan ended his speech by moving that the newspaper article be referred to the House of Representatives Standing Committee of Privileges (the "Privileges Committee") for investigation. The House approved the motion.

Privileges Committee
Over the ensuing weeks, the Privileges Committee met on a number of occasions to deal with the matter. Morgan, Fitzpatrick and Frank Browne (the editor of the Bankstown Observer at the time) appeared before the Committee and were questioned by its members. The Committee report, presented to the House of Representatives on 8 June 1955, concluded that a breach of privilege had occurred and recommended that the House take appropriate action.

Called before the Bar of the House

The House determined that Browne and Fitzpatrick be required to appear before the Bar of the Chamber on 10 June 1955 to answer the charges brought against them. Having heard statements from both men, the House, on a motion from Prime Minister Robert Menzies, voted that Browne and Fitzpatrick be committed to 90 days in gaol. The High Court of Australia considered an appeal on 22 and 24 June 1955, but the matter was dismissed.  Browne and Fitzpatrick applied to the Privy Council for leave to appeal against the High Court's judgment, but leave was refused. The sentences were served in the Canberra police lock-up (while appeals were pending) and Goulburn Gaol.

It was the first time anyone had ever been called to the Bar of the lower house, and it was the only time the Parliament has ever jailed anyone.  Gavin Souter has described it as the House using its new mace to swat two blowflies.

Impact on observers
The case left an "indelible impression" on Anthony Mason, junior counsel for Fitzpatrick and later Chief Justice of the High Court of Australia.  In a 1996 paper, he wrote "The two men were convicted and imprisoned by Parliament for contempt of Parliament without being given an opportunity to address Parliament on the question of their guilt or innocence.  They were convicted in absentia, in the absence of any specification in the warrant of commitment of the nature of the breach of privilege of which they were convicted, and after they were denied representation by counsel who was to appear on their behalf in the Committee of Privileges and in the House.  As counsel who was refused leave to appear, my sense of outrage over Parliament's denial of due process and natural justice remains undimmed after a lapse of 40 years".

Documents released
From 1944 until 1987, all meetings of the Privileges Committee were held behind closed doors, and none of the evidence or other material it considered was made public.  

In December 2000, the Parliament voted to publish the evidence from the Browne-Fitzpatrick case, and it is now held in the National Archives of Australia.

See also
 Imprisonment of John Drayton

References

Sources
 Australian Dictionary of Biography, Brown, Francis Courtney

Parliament of Australia
1955 in Australian law
Political history of Australia
Australian constitutional law
Legal history of Australia
1955 in case law
Australian House of Representatives